CatB may refer to:

 The Cathedral and the Bazaar, an essay, and later a book, by Eric S. Raymond on software engineering methods
 Catb.org, the website of Eric S. Raymond
 Cathepsin B, an enzymatic protein
 Catfish and the Bottlemen, a British indie rock band